The MicVac method is a pasteurization method for the food processing industry producing ready meals. Food ingredients are inserted into a package, which is sealed. The food is then cooked and pasteurized in the sealed package. During the heating process a valve on the package opens and releases steam and oxygen. The process time is short since the food is pasteurized with microwaves. When the microwave heating process stops the valve closes. Remaining steam condenses and causes an underpressure in the package. The final result is a cooked, pasteurized and vacuum-packed product. The short cooking time in combination with the absence of oxygen in the pack is unique for the method and has many advantages. The method has been used in the food industry since 2005.

The inventor of the technique is Dr. Joel Haamer and the company MicVac was founded in August 2000. Already in the 1970s, when Haamer tried to find a solution for better taking care of mussels, which are heat-sensitive and easily get rancid, he got the first ideas to the method. In the end of the 1990s, the microwave technology had reached such a progress that Haamer's idea was patented. During 5 years the development work took place and then, in 2005, the method was commercialized.

References

External links
 Micvac is mentioned on the website SIK - the Swedish Institute for Food and Biotechnology. Note! In swedish
 Programme; 5th International Thermal Processing Conference: new thermal technologies. Organized by CCFRA (Campden and Chorleywood Food Research Association)

Food preservation